The Greek Basket League Best Defender, or Greek Basket League Defensive Player of the Year, is an annual award for the best defensive player of each season of Greece's top-tier level professional basketball club league, the Greek Basket League.

Winners

Notes:
 There was no awarding in the 2019–20, due to the coronavirus pandemic in Europe.

References

External links
 Official Greek Basket League Site 
 Official Greek Basket League YouTube Channel 
 Official Hellenic Basketball Federation Site 
 Basketblog.gr 
 GreekBasketball.gr 

Greek Basket League
Best Defender
European basketball awards